Joaquín Urquiaga (29 March 1910 – 28 July 1965) was a football player and manager who played professionally in Mexico and Spain.

Career
Born in Zorroza, Biscay, Urquiaga played as a goalkeeper for Real Betis. He made his La Liga debut on 25 December 1932, and would help Betis win the league in the 1934–35 season. In four seasons, Urquiaga made 72 league appearances for Betis.

Fleeing the Spanish Civil War in 1937, Urquiaga traveled to Mexico where he joined Asturias. He also played for Veracruz, where he won the Primera División de México title in 1945–46.

After he retired from playing, Urquiaga became a football coach. He led Veracruz to the 1947–48 Copa México title. Urquiaga also managed Tampico, leading the club to a league and cup double in 1952–53.

Personal
Urquiaga died in Bilbao in July 1965.

References

1910 births
1965 deaths
Spanish footballers
Spanish expatriate footballers
Association football goalkeepers
Real Betis players
C.D. Veracruz footballers
La Liga players
Liga MX players
Expatriate footballers in Mexico
Spanish football managers
C.D. Veracruz managers
Footballers from Bilbao
Spanish expatriate sportspeople in Mexico
Liga MX managers
Spanish expatriate football managers
Asturias F.C. players